The following are the national records in athletics in Kazakhstan maintained by Athletic Federation of the Republic of Kazakhstan.

Outdoor

Key to tables:

+ = en route to a longer distance

h = hand timing

Men

Women

Mixed

Indoor

Men

Women

Notes

References
General
Kazakhstani Outdoor Records – Men 26 July 2019 updated
Kazakhstani Outdoor Records – Women 6 July 2019 updated
Kazakhstani Indoor Records – Men 18 January 2020 updated
Kazakhstani Indoor Records – Women 18 January 2020 updated
Specific

External links
Athletic Federation of the Republic of Kazakhstan web site

Kazakhstani
Records
Athletics
Athletics